An election to Waterford City Council took place on 11 June 2004 as part of that year's Irish local elections. 15 councillors were elected from three electoral divisions by PR-STV voting for a five-year term of office.

Results by party

Results by Electoral Area

Waterford No.1

Waterford No.2

Waterford No.3

External links

2004 Irish local elections
2004